The Secret Society – Boss is a 2003 Hong Kong crime drama film starring Michael Tse. It was a low-budget film shot on digital video. It was followed by a sequel, The Secret Society - The Best Hack, which was released on 10 April 2003, 14 days after this film's release.

Plot
Fai (Frankie Ng) is the leader of the Hung Hing gang. He is a furious, violent and prurience man and his wife (Kara Hui) can't stand him so she left him. Fai lives with his only daughter Wing Kei (Jenny Yam), whom he cherishes and loves very much. One time Fai lewd a drugged girl (An Ho) in the disco, later he finds out she is the daughter of Lam Hiu Tung (Lee Siu-kei) the leader of Yee Hing Gang. Tung requests for Fai's compensation, Fai denies it. When the two gangs prepare for a war, Anti-triad division officer Lee (Michael Tse) comes in their way and Tung leave with anger. Tung's man Chiu Chi Lung (Jason Chu) gives him a plan, to use Chi Wah (Raymond Cho), a famous gigolo to chase and seduce Fai's daughter as revenge on Fai. Wing Kei and Chi Wah start to fall in love quickly, but Fai opposes their love, so Kei goes to her mom for help. Fai's man threaten Chi Wah to leave Wing Kei and Kei hates her father after she knows it and decides to leave home and marry Chi Wah. Kei goes to the usurer as a guarantor for Wah, she gives her virgin to him too. After that Chi Wah exposes his actual face as a gigolo, Kei is hurt badly. Fai is very angry, and finds out Wah is the Man of Yee Hing Gang Lam Hiu Tung and Fai starts a night attack on Tung, swearing to kill all his gang.

Cast

See also
 Hong Kong films of 2003

External links
 
 The Secret Society: Boss  at Hong Kong Cinemagic

2003 films
2003 crime drama films
Triad films
2000s Cantonese-language films
Films set in Hong Kong
Films shot in Hong Kong
2000s Hong Kong films